The 2001 Bank of Ireland All-Ireland Senior Football Championship was the 115th staging of the All-Ireland Senior Football Championship, the Gaelic Athletic Association's premier inter-county Gaelic football tournament. The championship began on 6 May 2001 and ended on 23 September 2001.

The format of the championship saw the biggest change in over 100 years with the introduction of the All-Ireland qualifiers. This system saw teams who were defeated in the provincial championships enter a secondary championship and the chance to qualify for the All-Ireland series. The Leinster Championship abandoned its group stage and returned to a straight knockout system. London declined to field a team in the championship due to an outbreak of foot and mouth disease.

Kerry entered the championship as the defending champions, however, they were defeated by Meath in the All-Ireland semi-final.

On 23 September 2001, Galway won the championship following an 0–17 to 0–8 defeat of Meath in the All-Ireland final. This was their ninth All-Ireland title and their first in three championship seasons. Galway also became the first county to win the All Ireland by coming through the Qualifiers after losing the Connacht Semi-final to Roscommon, they beat Wicklow, Armagh and Cork in the Qualifiers where they again met Roscommon in the All Ireland Quarter-final. This time they got revenge by beating them. Beating Derry in the All Ireland Semi-final and Meath in the final to claim their ninth All Ireland Title.

Galway's Pádraic Joyce was the championship's top scorer with 3-45. He was also named as the Texaco Footballer of the Year, while Declan Meehan was chosen as the All Stars Footballer of the Year.

Format
The provincial championships in Munster, Leinster, Ulster and Connacht ran as usual on a "knock-out" basis.  But for the first time, these provincial games were then followed by the "Qualifier" system:
Round 1 of the qualifiers included all the counties that did not qualify for the Provincial Semi-finals, except for New York. An open draw was made to give eight pairings.
Round 2 consisted of the eight defeated teams in the Provincial Semi-finals playing against the eight winners from Round 1. A draw was made to determine the eight pairings.
Round 3 consisted of the 8 winners from Round 2 playing each other in an open draw format.
Round 4 consisted of each of the four teams defeated in the Provincial Finals shall playing against the four winners from Round 3. A draw was made to determine the four pairings.

The Leinster football championship reverts to normal just 1 Round pre to Quarter-finals.

In the All-Ireland Quarter-finals, each of the four Provincial Champions played one of the four winners from Round 4. The All-Ireland Semi-finals were determined on a provincial rota basis, initially determined by the Central Council. If a Provincial Championship winning team was defeated in its Quarter-final, the team that defeats it took its place in the Semi-final.

Results

Connacht Senior Football Championship
Due to an outbreak of foot and mouth disease in the UK, London took no part in the Connacht Senior Football Championship in 2001. The Connacht Council decided to cancel their home Quarter-final game against Mayo.

Quarter-finals

Semi-finals

Final

Munster Senior Football Championship

Quarter-finals

Semi-finals

Final

Ulster Senior Football Championship

Preliminary round

Quarter-finals

Semi-finals

Final

Leinster Senior Football Championship

First round

Quarter-finals

Semi-finals

Final

All-Ireland qualifiers

Round 1

Round 2

Round 3

Round 4

All-Ireland series
The provincial champions and the winners of round 4 contested the quarter finals. The quarter final matches would be between a provincial champion and a round 4 winner.

Quarter-finals

Three of the quarter-finals involved teams who had previously met in their respective provinces. The exception was Dublin v Kerry, which in itself was exceptional in that it was held at Semple Stadium in Thurles.

Semi-finals

Final

Championship statistics

Scoring

Overall

Single game

Miscellaneous
 The foot-and-mouth disease outbreak in the neighbouring island of Britain caused London to withdraw from the championship.
 Galway become the first county to win the All-Ireland by coming through the Back Door.

References

External links
 "2001 — Remembering first back-door season 20 years on", RTÉ, 2021